Marc Rovirola Moreno (born 12 September 1992) is a Spanish footballer who plays as a midfielder for Cultural y Deportiva Leonesa.

Club career
Born in Cornellà del Terri, Girona, Catalonia, Rovirola made his first team debuts with CD Banyoles in the 2009–10 campaign, in the regional leagues. In the 2010 summer he moved to Girona FC after having trials at FC Barcelona and Real Zaragoza, returning to youth football.

Rovirola subsequently appeared with CF Riudellots, the club's farm team, and with the reserves, both in the lower levels. On 4 March 2015, he played his first match as a professional, coming on as a late substitute for Álex Granell in a 2–1 home win against Real Valladolid in the Segunda División

On 11 July 2015, Rovirola moved to fellow league team UE Llagostera, after agreeing to a two-year deal, being subsequently loaned to CF Fuenlabrada. On 16 July of the following year he signed for Albacete Balompié, helping the club in their return to the second level.

On 31 January 2018, after failing to make an appearance during the first half of the campaign, Rovirola terminated his contract. On 22 February, he agreed to a deal with CD Atlético Baleares in the third division.

On 9 September 2020, he agreed a one-season deal with an option for another one with Cultural y Deportiva Leonesa.

References

External links

1992 births
Living people
People from Pla de l'Estany
Sportspeople from the Province of Girona
Spanish footballers
Footballers from Catalonia
Association football midfielders
Segunda División players
Segunda División B players
Primera Federación players
Girona FC B players
Girona FC players
CF Fuenlabrada footballers
UE Costa Brava players
Albacete Balompié players
CD Atlético Baleares footballers
Cultural Leonesa footballers